Iron(III) oxide-hydroxide or ferric oxyhydroxide is the chemical compound of iron, oxygen, and hydrogen with formula .

The compound is often encountered as one of its hydrates, ·n [rust]. The monohydrate · is often referred to as iron(III) hydroxide , hydrated iron oxide, yellow iron oxide, or Pigment Yellow 42.

Natural occurrences

Minerals 
Anhydrous ferric hydroxide occurs in the nature as the exceedingly rare mineral bernalite, Fe(OH)3·nH2O (n=0.0-0.25). Iron oxyhydroxides, are much more common and occur naturally as structurally different minerals (polymorphs) denoted by the Greek letters α, β, γ and δ. 

 Goethite, α-FeO(OH), has been used as an ochre pigment since prehistoric times. 

 Akaganeite is the β polymorph, formed by weathering and noted for its presence in some meteorites and the lunar surface.

 Lepidocrocite, the γ polymorph, is commonly encountered as rust on the inside of steel water pipes and tanks. 

 Feroxyhyte (δ) is formed under the high pressure conditions of sea and ocean floors, being thermodynamically unstable with respect to the α polymorph (goethite) at surface conditions.

Non-mineral 
 Siderogel is a naturally occurring colloidal form of iron(III) oxide-hydroxide.

Goethite and lepidocrocite, both crystallizing in orthorhombic system, are the most common forms of iron(III) oxyhydroxide and the most important mineral carriers of iron in soils.

Mineraloids 
Iron(III) oxyhydroxide is the main component of other minerals and mineraloids:

 Limonite is a commonly occurring mixture of mainly goethite, lepidocrocite, quartz and clay minerals. 

 Ferrihydrite is an amorphous or nanocrystalline hydrated mineral, officially •1.8 but with widely variable hydration.

Properties
The color of iron(III) oxyhydroxide ranges from yellow through dark-brown to black, depending on the degree of hydration, particle size and shape, and crystal structure.

Structure
The unit cell is tetragonal with a=1.048 and c=0.3023 nm, and contains eight formula units of FeOOH. Its dimensions are about 500 × 50 × 50 nm. Twinning often produces particles with the shape of hexagonal stars.

Chemistry
On heating, β- decomposes and recrystallizes as α- (hematite).

Uses
Limonite, a mixture of various hydrates and polymorphs of ferric oxyhydroxide, is one of the three major iron ores, having been used since at least 2500 BC.

Yellow iron oxide, or Pigment Yellow 42, is Food and Drug Administration (FDA) approved for use in cosmetics and is used in some tattoo inks. 

Iron oxide-hydroxide is also used in aquarium water treatment as a phosphate binder.

Iron oxide-hydroxide nanoparticles have been studied as possible adsorbents for lead removal from aquatic media.

Medication 
Iron polymaltose is used in treatment of iron-deficiency anemia.

Production
Iron(III) oxyhydroxide precipitates from solutions of iron(III) salts at pH between 6.5 and 8.  
Thus the oxyhydroxide can be obtained in the lab by reacting an iron(III) salt, such as ferric chloride or ferric nitrate, with sodium hydroxide:
 + 3 NaOH →  + 3 NaCl
 + 3 NaOH →  + 3 

In fact, when dissolved in water, pure  will hydrolyze to some extent, yielding the oxyhydroxide and making the solution acidic:
 + 2  ↔  + 3  
Therefore, the compound can also be obtained by the decomposition of acidic solutions of iron(III) chloride held near the boiling point for days or weeks:
  + 2  → (s) + 3 (g)
(The same process applied to iron(III) nitrate  or perchlorate  solutions yields instead particles of α-.)  

Another similar route is the decomposition of iron(III) nitrate dissolved in stearic acid at about 120 °C.

The oxyhydroxide prepared from ferric chloride is usually the β polymorph (akaganeite), often in the form of thin needles.

The oxyhydroxide can also be produced by a solid-state transformation from iron(II) chloride tetrahydrate ·4.

The compound also readily forms when iron(II) hydroxide is exposed to air:
4 +  → 4  + 2 
The iron(II) hydroxide can also be oxidized by hydrogen peroxide in the presence of an acid:
2 +  → 2

See also
Rust
Iron oxide
Yellow boy, a yellow precipitate when acidic runoff such as mine waste, is then neutralised

References

Iron(III) compounds
Hydroxides
Transition metal oxides